James Ernest Pilgrim (1874 – 1939) was an English footballer who played in the Football League for Chesterfield Town and Sheffield United.

References

1874 births
1939 deaths
English footballers
Association football defenders
English Football League players
Parkgate F.C. players
Sheffield United F.C. players
Chesterfield F.C. players
Rotherham Town F.C. (1899) players